Stud House is an early 18th-century house in the centre of Hampton Court Park near Hampton Court Palace. It is Grade II listed on the National Heritage List for England. It was traditionally the official residence of the Master of the Horse. The former stables at the house are  separately listed, also at Grade II. 

Stud House was bought by the Russian publisher Evgeny Lebedev in 2007. Its gardens were featured in the 2017 book The Secret Gardeners by Victoria Summerley and photographer Hugo Rittson Thomas.

References

Source
Summerley, Victoria; Rittson Thomas, Hugo (2017) The Secret Gardeners, Francis Lincoln. 

1700s establishments in England
Country houses in London
Gardens in London
Grade II listed houses in London
Hampton Court Palace
Houses completed in the 18th century
Houses in the London Borough of Richmond upon Thames